In re Kansas Indians, 72 U.S. (5 Wall.) 737 (1867), was a United States Supreme Court case in which the Court held that the state of Kansas was not authorized to levy taxes on, and seize for forfeiture, lands which are set aside for Indian tribes by the United States government, under treaty or otherwise.

Background 
The Kansas Indians case developed from three separate cases. Both Kansas and New York tried to tax the land of individual Indians. The Shawnee tribe moved to Kansas from Ohio and Missouri from 1825 to 1831, and were not to be considered part of the land of any state. In 1854, the tribe partitioned the land among its members, with the restriction that the land could not be sold without the permission of the United States. The  Wea tribe was in a similar position, as was the Miami tribe.

In all three cases, the local counties levied property taxes on land belonging to members of the tribe, and the tribes objected. The Kansas Supreme Court heard two of the cases, and ruled that the taxes were proper as the Indians held fee simple title to the land.

Supreme Court
Justice David Davis delivered the opinion of the Court. The Court held that a state could not levy taxes on the property of a tribe while the tribe was recognized by the United States.

References

External links
 

Kansas Supreme Court
United States Supreme Court cases
United States Supreme Court cases of the Chase Court